The Festival du Voyageur is an annual 10-day winter festival that takes place in Winnipeg, Manitoba, Canada. The event is held during each February in Winnipeg's French quarter, Saint-Boniface, and is western Canada's largest winter festival. It celebrates Canada's fur-trading past and unique French heritage and culture through entertainment, arts and crafts, music, exhibits, and displays.

The word "Voyageur" refers to those who worked for a fur-trading company and usually travelled by canoe. In the case of Festival du Voyageur, the title of "Official Voyageur" is given to ambassadors of the festival.

History

The idea for a winter festival to celebrate Manitoba's Francophonie was first proposed by Georges Forest, who became the first official "Voyageur" in 1967. The proposal was put forth to the then-City of St. Boniface, but the city's offer was insufficient.

In the summer of 1969, mayor of St. Boniface Ed Turner, along with city council, granted their support under the condition that Festival became an incorporated organization. Judge Robert Trudel became the first president of Festival du Voyageur. Festival du Voyageur Inc. was incorporated under the Companies Act of Manitoba on 18 December 1969. It received a city grant of $35,000 but had to give back all profits up to $35,000.

At a press conference held on 13 January 1970, mayor Turner announced that the city of Saint-Boniface would present a festival honouring the Voyageur of the fur-trading era, in celebration of Manitoba's centennial. The first Festival du Voyageur took place that year from February 26 to March 1, at Provencher Park, with an estimated attendance of 50,000 people. Acting as an 'ambassador' for the event, Georges Forest promoted the event by wearing clothing that represented the Voyageurs. This initiated the tradition of "Official Voyageurs", which continues to this day. The 1970 festival lasted four days and featured the walk down Provencher Boulevard, the Governor's Bal and the Voyageur Trading Post.

A large number of attendees required an unforeseen level of expenditure by festival organizers; by the festival's conclusion, the organization had debt in excess of C$40,000. To remedy their financial situation, the organizers held horse races as a fundraiser in conjunction with the 1971 festival. The 1971 festival was a success, drawing nearly 200,000 guests. However, instead of resolving the financial situation, the fundraiser pushed the organization further into debt.

The snow sculpture that won the 1971 event was of a pair of boots and a toque. This sculpture inspired the creation of a mascot, Léo La Tuque, who was introduced in 1972 and became the trademark of Festival du Voyageur.

Grants from the city of Winnipeg and the Secretary of State allowed the Festival to make arrangements with their creditors. The name was changed to "Festival du Voyageur" (the "of the" was dropped). For the 1972 festival, Arthur D'Eschambault was elected president. He hired a number of financial and management directors (most of whom were anglophone). The festival ran from February 21 to 27, and the profits amounted to C$108.46.

Two "school" voyageurs were appointed in 1977, to visit schools and teach children about the voyageurs and Festival.

In 1977, construction began on wooden log cabins in Whittier Park to accommodate the festival. The log cabins were constructed to be left there year-round. In 1978, the organization had accumulated enough surplus funds to make Whittier Park the permanent site of the festival. Provencher Park had become too small for the growing number of attendees.  These cabins formed the foundation of the historic reconstruction that became known as Fort Gibraltar.

In 1981, the Festival du Voyageur purchased an empty warehouse, located at 768 Taché Avenue, for administrative offices and to be used for an additional venue. The building became known as the Rendez-Vous and eventually came to include a bar named Le Canot.

From February to October 2001, a large house was constructed in Fort Gibraltar for the event. The house is called the Maison du Bourgeois.

The Rendez-Vous building on Taché was put up for sale in 2003, and sold in 2006. New administrative offices were found in a building at 233 Provencher Avenue, and it came to also feature a store called the Boutique du voyageur.

In 2005, a year-round interpretive centre was built in Fort Gibraltar.

In 2011, The Festival was awarded the Award of Excellence – Promotion of Linguistic Duality by the Commissioner of Official Languages Graham Fraser for its contribution to the vitality of the Franco-Manitoban Community.

Attendance

Current operation
In 2010, Festival du Voyageur Inc. (FDV Inc.) received $438,174 from Industry Canada's two-year Marquee Tourism Events Program (MTEP). In 2011, the festival saw 1,151 volunteers donate 14,393 hours of work.

The festival currently employs 13 full-time permanent staff and at the festivals peak employs roughly 200 people. The typical annual attendance is 100,000 people across all ten days of the festival.

The 2013 festival saw approximate revenue of $2.9 million.

In 2021, due to the COVID-19 pandemic, Festival du Voyageur offered virtual programming and broadcast its concert events over YouTube and Facebook.

Partners 
, organizations affiliated with the Festival du Voyageur include:

 Official partners: Bell MTS, Caisse Groupe Financier, and Canada Life (French: Canada Vie)
 Official sponsors: Université de Saint-Boniface, Liquor Mart Centre Culturel Franco-Manitobain, and Conseil jeunesse provincial.
 Media sponsors: ICI Manitoba, Winnipeg Free Press, Pattison, Unis TV, La liberté, and CTV
 "Friends of Festival:" Wawanesa Insurance, CN Rail, Éducatrices et éducateurs francophones du Manitoba, Qualico Communities, Roquette, Asper Foundation, and Assurart
 Funders: governments of Canada, Manitoba, Winnipeg, and Quebec; Winnipeg Arts Council; FrancoFonds; Musicaction; Foundation Assisting Canadian Talent on Recordings; and Safe at home MB

See also
Coureur des bois

References

External links

 

Winter festivals in Canada
Festivals in Winnipeg
Recurring events established in 1970
Franco-Manitoban culture
1970 establishments in Manitoba
Annual events in Winnipeg
Saint Boniface, Winnipeg
Arts festivals in Manitoba